BBC Four Goes Slow is a series of slow television programmes made for BBC Four, each without narration or underscore. The channel's editor, Cassian Harrison, stated that the series is an "antidote ... to the conventional grammar of television in which everything gets faster and faster". Similarities have been drawn between the series and the Norwegian trend of slow TV programmes.

Programmes

National Gallery: A Film by Frederick Wiseman 
Wiseman's film originally aired in December 2014. It is a three-hour tour of London's National Gallery, with no voiceover, underscore or sound effects.

Dawn Chorus: The Sounds of Spring 
Dawn Chorus: The Sounds of Spring is an hour-long composite recording of birdsong at sunrise in Devon.  The programme was made from three consecutive days' recording in three different locations. The programme has no voiceover or commentary, save for a few captions of historical information.

Handmade 
Handmade is a three-episode part of the series, and focuses on the production of three objects—Handmade: Glass documents the blowing and shaping of glass to create a jug, Handmade: Metal shows a bladesmith using a forge to make a knife, and Handmade: Wood sees a whittler create a wooden chair.

All Aboard! The Canal Trip 
All Aboard! The Canal Trip is a two-hour narrowboat journey along the Kennet and Avon Canal from Bath Top Lock (lock 13) to the Dundas Aqueduct. The episode features visual information but no spoken commentary.

All Aboard! The Sleigh Ride 
All Aboard! The Sleigh Ride is a two-hour real-time reindeer sleigh ride with Sami people filmed in Karasjok, Norway. It aired on 24 December 2015. It was repeated on 24 December 2016 and on 16 December 2017. The programme features two Sami women in traditional dress leading three reindeer, each with a sleigh, across the tundra following a traditional reindeer postal route from Karasjok north-westward to the sea, crossing frozen lakes and birch woodland, and encountering dog sleds, ice fishermen and other nomadic Sami people. The programme covers a two-hour period, over which time the light fades and the way is lit by flaming torches. The two Sami reindeer herders are Charlotte Iselin Mathisen and Anne-Louise Gaup.

All Aboard! The Country Bus
A two-hour bus ride along the Swaledale valley in North Yorkshire was broadcast on the bank holiday of 29 August 2016. The route 830 Dalesman bus operated by Arriva North East, travels from Richmond in the east to Ingleton in the west via the Yorkshire Dales National Park. In the journey the bus passes through Grinton, Reeth, Muker, Buttertubs Pass, Hawes, Ribblehead and Chapel-le-Dale. This episode of the series was the most popular with nearly a million viewers watching it at its peak with an average of 800,000 viewers, overtaking Channel 5 and a Film 4 showing of The Bourne Legacy.

Reception 
Michael Hogan, writing for The Daily Telegraph's website, gave the series a 2/5 rating, describing it as "hypnotic", implying it is relaxing. A review for The Independent said that the programmes were "oddly absorbing" and "soothing". Viewers took to social media to comment on the programme, with differing opinions; some described it as "the most boring TV show ever", and others "a proper [television] programme".

References 

BBC television documentaries
2015 British television series debuts
2016 British television series endings
Kennet and Avon Canal
Slow television
English-language television shows